Kalumpang is an Austronesian dialect cluster of Sulawesi, Indonesia. Its dialects are only slightly closer to each other than they are to related languages.

References

Languages of Sulawesi
South Sulawesi languages